Gehlingia dibrachida is a species of enigmatic Ediacaran organism from South Australia described in 1998. Gehlingia has been described as having many characteristics of petalonamids, although it has been classified as a rather close relative of the Tribrachidium. The overall shape of Gehlingia contradicts this affinity, however, with its shape being a more Bilaterally symmetrical one although the basic structure similar to that of Tribrachidium appears in Gehlingia as separate branches extending into bifurcating minor branches along with "thumb structures" that are apparent in Tribrachidium in the form of side bulges on an axis.

Etymology 
The name of the genus, "Gehlingia", is in honour of the Australian palaeontologist specialising in Ediacaran fossils, James G. Gehling.

Description 
Gehlingia dibrachida represents a frond-like bilaterally symmetric organism with two fronds with each half of them having a swollen axis on an inner edge. The organism's axis bifurcated once and bifurcates towards the outer edge of its two fronds. Similar deformations occur in both Tribrachidium and Gehlingia some notable ones being delaying of the bifurcation and tubular structures being visible between the striae. A number of tubular structures emanate from the axis and are often either straight or curved. A deep groove separates the two axes. The tubular structures of the two "fronds" end abruptly and in turn form a smooth edge to the organism.

In Gehlingia (as well as Tribrachidium) there are "thumb" structures that appear to have been positioned on the left and right side of the main branch. In Tribrachidium, the thumb structures are visible as side bulges which extend out of an axis.

Further reading 
Environmental evolution, page 165
Potential organisms related to the trilobozoa

See also 
List of Ediacaran genera
Tribrachidium

References 

Ediacaran
Ediacaran life
Ediacaran first appearances
Enigmatic prehistoric animal genera
Prehistoric animal genera
Fossil taxa described in 1998
Fossils of Australia
Trilobozoa